During the 2017–18 S.C. Braga season, the club competed in the Primeira Liga, Taça de Portugal, Taça da Liga and UEFA Europa League.

Pre-season and friendlies

Competitions

Primeira Liga

League table

Results summary

Results by matchday

Matches

Taça de Portugal

Taça da Liga

Group A

UEFA Europa League

Qualifying stages

Third qualifying round

Play-off round

Group stage

Knockout stage

Round of 32

References

S.C. Braga seasons
Braga